Dirty Ammo is a live EP by the band Dead Confederate released by The Artists Organization. All of the songs on Dirty Ammo (EP) were recorded in Atlanta, GA at the Earl on May 27, 2009. Dirty Ammo includes five original songs, including one previously unreleased song called "Guns," and two cover songs. Dead Confederate donated one dollar for every copy sold to help rebuild the Georgia Theater, which was destroyed in a fire in 2009.

Track listing
All tracks recorded live.

Personnel
Dead Confederate
 Hardy Morris - vocals, electric guitar
 Brantley Senn - bass, vocals
 Walker Howle - electric guitar
 John Watkins - keyboards
 Jason Scarboro - drums

Production
 Ross Gower - engineer, mixing, mastering
 Dustin Lane, Ryan Zacarius, Brantley Senn - artwork

References

External links
 Official Website - Dead Confederate

2009 EPs
Dead Confederate albums
Live EPs